Trinity Evangelical Lutheran Church (previously known as Trinity German Evangelical Lutheran Church) is a historic Lutheran church at 404 S. Third Street in Columbus, Ohio.

It was built in 1856 and added to the National Register of Historic Places in 1985.

References

External links
 
 

Lutheran churches in Ohio
Churches on the National Register of Historic Places in Ohio
National Register of Historic Places in Columbus, Ohio
Gothic Revival church buildings in Ohio
Romanesque Revival church buildings in Ohio
Churches completed in 1856
Churches in Columbus, Ohio
German-American culture in Ohio
Buildings in downtown Columbus, Ohio